Vologda II, sometimes stylized as Vologda-2, is a railway station in Vologda, Russia. It is located on Northern Railway.

See also 
 Vologda I railway station

References 

Vologda
Railway stations in Vologda Oblast
Railway stations opened in 1906